John Mulholland (1946 – 12 October 2022) was an Irish politician who was the Mayor of Galway from 1986 to 1987 and again from 1996 to 1997.

Life and career
Mulholland was born in Dublin in 1946, the eldest of six children of Ned Mulholland of Kinnegad and Betty O'Donoghue of Ballingary, County Tipperary. The family moved to Galway in 1948. In 1968 he married Margaret Flynn of Letterfrack, and moved to London where he worked in a betting office and as a fingerprint officer at Scotland Yard. He returned to Galway to take charge of the family's betting shop. He and Margaret have children Alan, Lisa, Eddie and Aoife Mulholland. Mulholland expanded the business, and by the early 21st century owned ten betting shops. 

Influenced by Garret FitzGerald, Mulholland stood for Fine Gael and was elected with a large majority for the city's South Ward in 1985, becoming mayor the following year. Highlights included welcoming home the Galway Minor's team, who were All-Ireland Champions, and included his eldest child, Alan. On 10 October 1986 he officially opened the city's first purpose built City Hall. He was again elected mayor in 1996, and oversaw occasions such as a civic reception for three-time Olympic Gold Medal winner, Michelle Smyth, leading Galway's highly successful business mission to Milwaukee and Chicago. As part of a fundraiser for Galway Hospice, Mayor Mulholland graciously allowed himself to be kidnapped, and ransomed from, "members of the notorious Galway Youth Federation." He was host to Chief Garry White Deer of the Choctaw Nation on his official visit to Galway; one hundred and fifty years earlier, the Choctaw Nation had sent famine relief to the people of Ireland, despite at the time being in the process of banishment from their homelands.

Mulholland died on 12 October 2022, at the age of 76.

References

Sources
 Role of Honour:The Mayors of Galway City 1485-2001, William Henry, Galway 2001.

External links
 https://web.archive.org/web/20071119083053/http://www.galwaycity.ie/AllServices/YourCouncil/HistoryofTheCityCouncil/PreviousMayors/

1946 births
2022 deaths
Fine Gael politicians
Local councillors in Galway (city)
Mayors of Galway